Grevillea scabrida is a species of flowering plant in the family Proteaceae and is endemic to the south-west of Western Australia. It is a densely-branched shrub with linear leaves and erect clusters of white flowers.

Description
The edges of the leaves are rolled under, obscuring most of the lower surface, and the upper surface is rough to the touch.

This grevillea is similar to G. lissopleura, but that species has smooth leaves and straight branchlets. Grevillea scabrida probably only regenerates from seed.

Taxonomy
Grevillea scabrida was first formally described by the botanist Charles Austin Gardner in 1936 in the Journal of the Royal Society of Western Australia from specimens he collected with William Blackall "near the northern base of Mount Singleton" in 1931. The specific epithet (scabrida) means "rough or gritty to the touch".

Distribution and habitat
This grevillea grows in red clay loam, stony loam or laterite and is only known in the Mount Singleton to Mount Gibson area between Wubin and Paynes Find in the Avon Wheatbelt and Yalgoo bioregions of south-western Western Australia.

Conservation status
Grevillea scabrida is listed as "Priority Three" by the Government of Western Australia Department of Biodiversity, Conservation and Attractions, meaning that it is poorly known and known from only a few locations but is not under imminent threat.

See also
 List of Grevillea species

References

scabrida
Proteales of Australia
Eudicots of Western Australia
Taxa named by Charles Gardner
Plants described in 1936